A ewer is a vase-shaped pitcher.

Ewer may also refer to:

People
Fred Ewer (1898–1971), English footballer 
Isaac Ewer (died c.1650), English soldier and one of the Regicides of King Charles I of England
John Ewer (died 1774), English bishop 
Philemon Ewer (1702–1750), English shipbuilder
William Norman Ewer (1885–1976), British journalist

Other uses
Ewer Airport, an airport in Ewer, Indonesia
Ewer Pass, a pass on Laurie Island in the Antarctic, named after John R. Ewer
 Ewer & Co, British music publisher later incorporated into Novello & Co

See also
Ewers, people with the surname Ewers